The 1977–78 NBA season was the Golden State Warriors' 32nd season in the NBA and 15th in the San Francisco Bay Area.

Draft picks

Roster

Regular season

Season standings

z – clinched division title
y – clinched division title
x – clinched playoff spot

Record vs. opponents

Awards and records
 E.C. Coleman, NBA All-Defensive Second Team
 Rick Barry, NBA All-Star Game

References

Golden State Warriors seasons
Golden State
Golden
Golden